The krap is a Southeast Asian musical instrument used in Cambodia and Thai for percussion.

Thailand
The Thai version of the instrument comes in three varieties.

The krap koo (กรับคู่) is made from two pieces of split bamboo, approximately 40 cm in length.

The krap puang (กรับพวง) is made from thin wood or brass, often consisting of a number of pieces tied with string. It is used in royal ceremonies.

The krap saepa (กรับเสภา) is made from wood, like the ranat ek. It has a length of about 20 cm and a thickness of about 5 cm. The krap saepa is rectangular in shape, and is used in pairs.

Cambodia
The Cambodians have at least five versions of the instrument, based on the kind of music it supports and the materials used to make the instruments.

The Krap Chayam is constructed of blocks of bamboo and is used in chayam music, being clapped together in the player's hands. The Krap nyee (ក្រាបញី krap female) was originally made from seashells, but is now also of bamboo, still shaped like shells. It is used in dance music, clicked together dancing women, like castanets. The Krap chmol (ក្រាបឈ្មោល krap male) is made from bamboo of different lengths, one length held still while hitting it with the other, striking a rhythm. It has coins attached that jingle. The krap kour is a length of bamboo with metal balls attached, and is played by tapping it in the palm of the other hand. Finally there is the krap arak, used in arak music by the Cham, consisting of one-meter lengths of bamboo, stamped on the ground to the beat, like a stamping drum.

Another Cambodian version is the krap fuong, listed in 1964 as being made of 2 pieces of hardwood, cut in different sized rectangles.

See also
Traditional Thai musical instruments
Traditional Cambodian musical instruments

References

External links
Sound sample, Krap (aka Trae Rapoung)
Article has some of the Khmer script for names used in Cambodian section.

Thai musical instruments
Asian percussion instruments